We're Movin' Up is an album by the American band Atlantic Starr, released in 1989. The band supported the album with a North American tour that included a stint with Surface.

The album peaked at No. 125 on the Billboard 200. "My First Love" and "My Sugar" were hits on the Black Singles Chart.

Production
The album was produced by brothers and bandmembers David Lewis and Wayne Lewis. Singer Porsha Martin replaced Barbara Weathers; Jonathan Lewis joined on keyboards. "My First Love" includes a spoken intro by Wayne Lewis.

Critical reception

The Los Angeles Times stated: "Continuing to move in a pop direction, Atlantic Starr can attribute its success to well-crafted songs and its crafty selection of stand-out female group members to help embellish them." The Washington Post opined that "on the title song from its new album, We're Movin' Up, Atlantic Starr sings the chorus with the bland perkiness of anonymous jingle singers in a beer commercial."

The Palm Beach Post determined that We're Movin' Up "features some noteworthy songs from the seasoned professionals, but the album is ultimately bogged down by super-glossy, sound-alike ballads." The Buffalo News concluded that "tracks like the title cut and 'Don't Start the Fire' are filled with the driving rhythms that fans have come to expect."

AllMusic noted the "prototype classy love ballads, dance-pop, urban contemporary production/arrangements, and one or two above-average leads."

Track listing

References

Atlantic Starr albums
1989 albums
Warner Records albums